Frederick W. Nesser (September 10, 1897 - July 2, 1967) was a professional American football player in the "Ohio League" and the early National Football League for the Columbus Panhandles. He was also a member of the Nesser Brothers, a group consisting of seven brothers who made-up the most famous football family in the United States from 1907 until the mid-1920s. He was the tallest and biggest of the football-playing brothers at six feet five inches and 250 pounds. He played mostly tackle or end, but sometimes he lined up in the backfield, to provide blocking.

Fred also was a professional boxer and a legitimate contender for the heavyweight title, held by Jess Willard. However, in 1915, a broken wrist ended his boxing career.

Around 1987 Fred's daughter, Vera, tried to get the city of Columbus to name a street for the Nesser Brothers. Her request was turned down.

References

Forgotten NFL Family: the Nesser Brothers of Columbus, Ohio 

1897 births
1967 deaths
Players of American football from Columbus, Ohio
American football offensive linemen
Columbus Panhandles players
Columbus Panhandles (Ohio League) players
Nesser family (American football)